Charles Hudson may refer to:

Sir Charles Hudson, 1st Baronet (1730–1813), English baronet
Charles Hudson (American politician) (1795–1881), American historian and politician, Congressman in U.S. House of Representatives from Massachusetts
Charles Hudson (Australian politician) (1866–1937), Australian state politician
Charles Hudson (baseball) (born 1959), American major league baseball player from Ennis, Texas
Charles Hudson (climber) (1828–1865), mountain climber
Charles Hudson (footballer) (1872–1955), English footballer
C. B. Hudson (born 1974), musician
Charles Edward Hudson (1892–1959), British Victoria Cross recipient and general
Charles M. Hudson (1932–2013), American historian, archaeologist, and author
Charles Thomas Hudson (1828–1903), English naturalist
Charlie Hudson (born 1949), American major league baseball player from Ada, Oklahoma
Charlie Hudson (footballer, born 1920) (1920–2008), English footballer, centre forward for Accrington Stanley
Charlie Hudson, pigeon breeder and racer, owner of The King of Rome